The perpetual foreigner stereotype is a racist or xenophobic form of nativism in which naturalized and even native-born citizens (including families that have lived in a country for generations) are perceived by some members of the majority as foreign because they belong to a minority ethnic or racial group. Naturalization laws vary, and some countries follow a rule of jus sanguinis. Some countries have many refugees or other resident aliens. A diaspora such as the overseas Chinese is often regarded as belonging to their ancestral homeland rather than to the country in which they live.

United States 
It has been particularly applied as a negative stereotype of Asian Americans, but it has also affected other minority groups, which have been considered to be "the other" and therefore legally unassimilable, either historically or currently. In personal interactions, it can take the form of an act of microaggression in which a member of a minority group may be asked, "Where are you from?" It can also take the form of an explicit act of aggression in which a member of a minority group may be told, "Go back to where you came from." African Americans have been told "go back to Africa" as a racial insult, despite the fact that on average, they are more likely to have a multi-generational family history in the United States than white Americans are.

The U.S. Equal Employment Opportunity Commission defines workplace comments like "Go back where you came from" as a potentially illegal form of ethnic harassment. The message conveys a sense that the person is "not supposed to be there, or that it isn't their place," and it is often encountered when the minority person is "speaking out in predominantly white spaces."

Hate crimes, such as the murder of Vincent Chin, are described as the most brutal form of the perpetual foreigner syndrome.

Post-Soviet states 
Crimean Tatars are an indigenous people of Crimea with clearly established pre-Golden Horde Scythian, Greek, and Goth roots, but authorities and nativists long have treated them as perpetual foreigners. When Crimean Tatars who had been forcibly exiled in the Stalin era attempted to return to Crimea before perestroika, they were frequently met with severe hostility by officials who took violent measures to keep them out and had orders to prevent them from returning to their native land. Meanwhile, Russian publications referred to deported Crimean Tatars returning to the places of their birth as foreigners.

Volga Germans had citizenship in the Soviet Union and later in the Russian Federation, but also in Germany under jus sanguinis. During World War II they were distrusted as foreigners and many were deported to Siberia. After the fall of the Soviet Union many returned to their ancestral homeland, Germany, where they are often seen as Russians.

Haitians in the Dominican Republic 

Before 2010, the Constitution of the Dominican Republic generally granted citizenship to anyone born in the country, except children of diplomats and persons "in transit". The 2010 constitution was amended to define all undocumented residents as "in transit". On September 23, 2013, the Dominican Republic Constitutional Court issued a ruling that retroactively applied this definition to 1929, the year Haiti and the Dominican Republic formalized the border. The decision stripped Dominican citizenship from about 210,000 people who were born in the Dominican Republic after 1929 but are descended from undocumented immigrants from Haiti. Many Haitians born in the Dominican Republic do not have Haitian citizenship and have never been to Haiti; hence the decision rendered them at least temporarily stateless.

See also 

 Allosemitism
 Koreans in Japan
 Laowai
 Pendatang asing
 Rootless cosmopolitan

References

Ethnic and racial stereotypes in the United States
Anti-Asian sentiment in the United States
Racism in the United States
Anti-immigration politics in the United States
Race legislation in the United States
Anti-Chinese sentiment in the United States